Thomas Hambrook (6 June 1922 – 2 September 1987) was a New Zealand cricketer. He played 33 first-class matches for Auckland between 1951 and 1959.

See also
 List of Auckland representative cricketers

References

External links
 

1922 births
1987 deaths
New Zealand cricketers
Auckland cricketers
Cricketers from Greater London